Gerhard Tomin Olsen (May 27, 1892 – July 1, 1955) was a Norwegian track and field athlete who competed in the 1912 Summer Olympics.

He participated in the high jump competition and cleared 1.75 metre but did not qualify for the final. He finished 13th.

References

1892 births
1955 deaths
Norwegian male high jumpers
Athletes (track and field) at the 1912 Summer Olympics
Olympic athletes of Norway